Osteocephalus helenae is a species of frog in the family Hylidae. It is widely distributed in the Amazon Basin and is known from the lowlands of Bolivia, Peru, Brazil, Colombia, Venezuela, Guyana, and French Guiana. The specific name helenae honors Helen Beulah Thompson Gaige, an American herpetologist. Common name Helena's  treefrog has been proposed for it.

Taxonomy
Osteocephalus helenae was described in 1919 by Alexander Grant Ruthven as Hyla helenae based on three recently metamorphosed specimens. The relationships of this species were unclear and it was considered incertae sedis within Hyla, until  and colleagues concluded in 2013 that Ruthven's Hyla helenae is the same species as Osteocephalus germani described by Ron and colleagues in 2012 and that the correct name for this taxon is Osteocephalus helenae.

Description
The snout is truncate but may sometimes be rounded in females. The tympanum is visible but partly concealed dorsally. The fingers and the toes bear large discs and are webbed, the toes more heavily so. Dorsal skin bears tubercles in males but is smooth in females. Coloration is variable, ranging dorsally from brown with dark brown marks to light gray with dark brown marks; the ventrum is light cream and may have dark brown flecks. There is a cream-colored suborbital mark. Males have a paired vocal sac.

Habitat
The region of the type locality of Osteocephalus helenae is lowland tropical rainforest.

Conservation status
The assessment of Osteocephalus helenae for the IUCN Red List of Threatened Species in 2004 predates the current delimitation of this species.

References

helenae
Amphibians of Bolivia
Amphibians of Brazil
Amphibians of Colombia
Amphibians of French Guiana
Amphibians of Guyana
Amphibians of Peru
Amphibians of Venezuela
Amphibians described in 1919
Taxa named by Alexander Grant Ruthven
Taxonomy articles created by Polbot